The Red House Formation is a geologic formation found in the Caballo Mountains in New Mexico. It preserves fossils dating back to the middle to late Pennsylvanian.

Description
The formation consists mostly of thinly bedded dark gray limestone and shale  or claystone containing limestone nodules and lenses. Some massive cherty limestone beds are locally present. It rests unconformably on the Lake Valley Limestone or Percha Shale, with a thin sandstone bed at its base. It is overlain by the Nakaye Formation.

Fossils
Many of the beds are abundantly fossiliferous. The formation dates from the late Morrowan (Bashkirian) to the early Atokan (Moscovian).

History of investigation
The formation was first described by V.C. Kelley and Caswell Silver in 1952 and assigned to the now-obsolete Magdalena Group.  G.O. Bachman and D.A. Myers criticized its definition in 1975, but it is accepted by Barry Kues and Katherine Giles. In 2016, Lucas and coinvestigators recommended that the local names Green Canyon Group, Arrey Formation, Apodaca Formation, Mud Springs Group, Fra Cristobal Formation, and Chuchillo Negro Formation be abandoned in favor of the Red House Formation.

See also

 List of fossiliferous stratigraphic units in New Mexico
 Paleontology in New Mexico

References

Carboniferous formations of New Mexico
Carboniferous southern paleotropical deposits